Brazil competed at the 1924 Summer Olympics in Paris, France. Twelve competitors, all men, took part in fifteen events in four sports.

Athletics

Eight athletes represented Brazil in 1924. It was the nation's debut appearance in the sport.

Ranks given are within the heat.

Rowing

Two rowers represented Brazil in 1924. It was the nation's second appearance in the sport as well as the Games.
Ranks given are within the heat.

Shooting

A single sport shooter represented Brazil in 1924. It was the nation's second appearance in the sport as well as the Games.

References

External links
Official Olympic Reports

Nations at the 1924 Summer Olympics
1924
Olympics